Anthochlamys is a genus of flowering plants belonging to the family Amaranthaceae.

Its native range is Iran to Pakistan and Central Asia.

Species:

Anthochlamys afghanica 
Anthochlamys multinervis 
Anthochlamys polygaloides 
Anthochlamys tjanschanica 
Anthochlamys turcomanica

References

Amaranthaceae
Amaranthaceae genera